The Tennessee Secretary of State is an office created by the Tennessee State Constitution.  The Secretary of State is responsible for many of the administrative aspects of the operation of the state government of Tennessee. The current Secretary of State is Tre Hargett.

Selection process
According to the Tennessee Constitution of 1870, the Secretary of State is to be elected to a four-year term by the General Assembly in a joint convention. "Joint convention" means that the 99 state Representatives and 33 state Senators sit as a single body and cast individual votes.  A majority of the 132 votes (67) is thus required for election.  As this office is elected on a partisan basis, this means that the party having an overall majority of members in the two houses will elect its nominee secretary of state.  Since Reconstruction, in Tennessee this invariably resulted in the secretary of state being a Democrat until 2009, when the Republicans gained the majority of seats in the General Assembly.  The election of the secretary of state occurs in the cycle opposite to that of the election of the governor of Tennessee; in other words the term of the Tennessee Secretary of State is roughly coincident with that of the President of the United States, generally beginning and ending only a few days earlier.

Tennessee's method of selection stands in contrast to that of nearly all other U.S. states, where the secretary of state is generally either popularly elected on a statewide basis or appointed by the Governor of the state.  In contrast to the practice of some states, in Tennessee the secretary of state is not high in the order of succession to the governorship; the speakers of the Senate and House are the first two in line.

Secretary of State is one of only three state "constitutional officers" other than governor under the Tennessee Constitution; most other states have more.  In contrast to this office, the other two, the State Treasurer and the Comptroller of the Treasury (a position similar to State Auditor in many other states), are elected by the joint convention to two-year terms.  There are no constitutional limits on the number of terms to which a person can be elected to any of these offices.  The office headed by the secretary of state is officially styled the "Tennessee Department of State".

Duties
As the secretary of state is elected by the legislature, the secretary of state's office is considered to be part of the legislative branch, not the executive branch, of government in Tennessee.  Duties of the secretary of state's office include the chartering of corporations, the registration of trademarks and service marks, and the administration of elections. The secretary of state also publishes the biennial Tennessee Blue Book, the official guide to all three branches of Tennessee State Government, and other state publications including the publication of all public and private acts enacted by the General Assembly. The secretary of state is further charged with the regulation of charitable solicitations, the operations of the state library and archives, and the administration of the state Economic Commission on Women.  To discharge the above duties, the Tennessee Department of State employs several administrative law judges.

In history
According to some historians, during the American Civil War, Secretary of State Edward H. East succeeded to the governorship when Andrew Johnson, who had served as military governor, became Vice President of the United States on March 4, 1865, and served as governor until April 5, when William "Parson" Brownlow was inaugurated as governor.  The official Tennessee Blue Book, published by the secretary of state's office, does not include East on its list of governors.  As the Tennessee General Assembly ceased to meet during the Civil War and much of the ordinary process of government ceased effective function in the state, East had been appointed Secretary of State by Johnson.  Those who recognize East's governorship do so on the theory that he was the highest-ranking remaining state official once Johnson had become Vice President.

The most prominent secretary of state in Tennessee history was probably Joe C. Carr.  Carr served on three occasions for a total of 27 years in the office, far longer than anyone else; in addition, his wife held the office while he was in military service during World War II.  As secretary of state and thus the official responsible for conducting elections in the state, he was the nominal defendant in the famous 1962 Supreme Court case Baker v. Carr, in which the Supreme Court held that Congressional and legislative districts had to be of substantially equal populations in order to comply with the "equal protection" provision of the Fourteenth Amendment to the United States Constitution (the so-called "one man one vote" decision). (Carr's name as defendant was merely ex officio; the General Assembly, not the secretary of state, was responsible for setting the district boundaries, Carr's responsibility was to publish the resulting map and conduct elections accordingly.)

In the 1970s and 1980s the secretary of state's office was given the responsibility for issuing and administering bingo licenses.  An investigation into irregularities in the issuance of these licenses (Operation Rocky Top) resulted in several indictments and the suicide of then-Secretary of State Gentry Crowell.  As a result, bingo was made illegal in Tennessee, which it remains, except that it has been legal as an annual fundraising event for a recognized 501c(19) war veteran's organization since a 2014 amendment to the state constitution.

The current secretary of state, Tre Hargett, has served since January 2009. He had previously served as Minority Leader in the Tennessee House of Representatives.

List of past secretaries of state
The following have held the office of Secretary of State in Tennessee:

See also
 Tennessee Attorney General

References

External links

 
State agencies of Tennessee
1792 establishments in the United States